Tammann is the name of

 Gustav Andreas Tammann (1932–2019), cosmologist, grandson of Gustav Heinrich Johann Apollon Tammann
 asteroid 18872 Tammann, named after the former
 Gustav Heinrich Johann Apollon Tammann, physicist of Göttingen university